The 1953–54 La Liga was the 23rd season since its establishment. Real Madrid conquered their third title, 21 years after their last one.

Team locations

League table

Results

Relegation group

Standings

Results

Top scorers

External links
Official LFP Site 

1953 1954
1953–54 in Spanish football leagues
Spain